Alina is a Point of Sale Malware or POS RAM Scraper that is used by cybercriminals to scrape credit card and debit card information from the point of sale system. It first started to scrape information in late 2012. It resembles JackPOS Malware.

Process of Alina POS RAM Scraper
Once executed, it gets installed on the user's computer and checks for updates. If an update is found, it removes the existing Alina code and installs the latest version. Then, for new installations, it adds the file path to an AutoStart runkey to maintain persistence. Finally, it adds java.exe to the %APPDATA% directory and executes it using the parameter alina=<path_to_executable> for new installations or, update=<orig_exe>;<new_exe> for upgrades.

Alina inspects the user's processes with the help of Windows API calls:
 CreateToolhelp32Snapshot() takes a snapshot of all running processes
 Process32First()/Process32Next() retrieve the track 1 and track 2 information in the process memory
Alina maintains a blacklist of processes, if there is no process information in the blacklist it uses OpenProcess() to read and process the contents in the memory dump. Once the data is scraped Alina sends it to C&C servers using an  HTTP POST command that is hardcoded in binary.

See also
 Point-of-sale malware
 Cyber security standards
 List of cyber attack threat trends

References

Carding (fraud)
Cyberwarfare
Windows trojans